Alina Georgiana Stănculescu (born 29 April 1990) is a retired Romanian artistic gymnast. She is a silver European medalist with the team. She was a successful junior gymnast winning gold on beam and silver with the team at  the 2004 Junior European Championships.

References

External links
 

1990 births
Living people
Gymnasts from Bucharest
Romanian female artistic gymnasts
European champions in gymnastics
21st-century Romanian women